Content House Kenya (also Content House, and Content House Education Trust) is a film, television, and commercials production company which is based in Nairobi, Kenya. It is a collective of filmmakers, writers, and photographers seeking to create and distribute content on topics that are underrepresented in the mainstream media but are still of great importance to the public. Their documentary Gun to Tape was nominated for Best Documentary at the 9th Africa Movie Academy Awards. Their feature documentary The Last Fight was selected for the 2016 Africa International Film Festival and the 2016 edition of the Luxor African Film Festival.

Productions 
 Floating, Flying (2019) The Artists' Xchange photography series 
Ivory Belongs to Elephants (2019) short documentary for Giving Nature a Voice 
The Flyest Wedding in Africa (2018) The Artists' Xchange photography series 
Stories from Turkana (2015) short documentary series in partnership with Cordaid
 The Last Fight (2015) a feature-length documentary film
 Kenya Navy at 50 (2014) a short documentary film
 Kenya's Olympic Journey (2012) a photo exhibition
 Gun to Tape (2012) a short documentary film

References 

Film production companies of Kenya